Thenuka Dhananjaya (born 4 May 1994) is a Sri Lankan cricketer. He made his first-class debut for Kalutara Physical Culture Club in Tier B of the 2016–17 Premier League Tournament on 9 December 2016.

References

External links
 

1994 births
Living people
Sri Lankan cricketers
Kalutara Physical Culture Centre cricketers
Place of birth missing (living people)